Suchitepéquez is one of the 22 departments of Guatemala. Its capital is Mazatenango.
It is situated in the southwestern region of Guatemala, bordering Quetzaltenango, Sololá, and Chimaltenango to the north, the Pacific Ocean to the south, Escuintla to the east, and Retalhuleu to the west.

Municipalities 
 Chicacao
 Cuyotenango
 Mazatenango
 Patulul
 Pueblo Nuevo
 Río Bravo
 Samayac
 San Antonio Suchitepéquez
 San Bernardino
 San Francisco Zapotitlán
 San Gabriel
 San José El Idolo
 San Juan Bautista
 San Lorenzo, Suchitepéquez
 San Miguel Panán
 San Pablo Jocopilas
 Santa Bárbara
 Santo Domingo Suchitepequez
 Santo Tomás La Unión
 Zunilito

References

External links
Interactive department map

 
Departments of Guatemala